The WTA Tour is the elite tour for professional women's tennis organised by the Women's Tennis Association (WTA). The 1989 WTA Tour included the four Grand Slam tournaments, the WTA Tour Championships and the WTA Category 1-5 events. ITF tournaments are not part of the WTA Tour, although they award points for the WTA World Ranking.

Schedule
The table below shows the 1989 WTA Tour schedule.

Key

November 1988

January

February

March

April

May

June

July

August

September

October

November

Rankings
Below are the 1989 WTA year-end rankings (November 26, 1989) in both singles and doubles competition:

See also
 1989 Nabisco Grand Prix

References

 
WTA Tour
WTA Tour seasons